Kustrzyce  is a village in the administrative district of Gmina Sędziejowice, within Łask County, Łódź Voivodeship, in central Poland.

The village has a population of 250.

References

External links
Location of Kustrzyce

Kustrzyce